Barak, also called the Barak Turkmens, is a Turkoman tribe that mainly originates in the Barak Plain in the southeastern portion of the province of Gaziantep in south-central Turkey.

Etymology
The term Barak is popularly thought to mean some kind of a dog, regularly connoting an insult towards the group. According to the 19th-century Turkish-French dictionary compiled by the Ottoman-Armenian linguist Artin Hindoğlu, barak meant "dog", specifically barbet. According to Encyclopædia Iranica, it means "hairless dog" in Kipchak Turkic, while other sources conversely associate it with a "long-haired dog". In the old Turkic calendar, Barak was the name of the dog year. Itbarak or just Barak was a dog-headed manly creature mentioned in Oghuz Khagan Narratives. According to Sevan Nişanyan, "barak" means fast-running and raider.

History

Origin myth
According to their dastan of origin, they were a part of the tribe of Uzun Hasan. After his death, Baraks chose Feriz Bey as their leader. A Sunni himself, Feriz Bey converted Alevi Muslim Baraks to Sunni Islam. According to this narrative, it is believed that Baraks were in Khorasan, and 80 thousand Barak tents led by Feriz Bey and 4 thousand Abdal tents led by Ashik Dedemoğlu migrated to the vicinity of Yozgat in Anatolia.

Afterwards, the Baraks started having problems with the Ottoman authorities: According to the first version of the story, nearby villages in Central Anatolia would ask the Ottomans to remove these migrants from their lands annoyed by Baraks' presence. According to another version, the postal service of the Ottomans would get robbed. Suspicious of the Baraks, the authorities arrested a Barak Turkmen. After a meeting between the elders of the tribe, the Baraks decided to rebel, liberating the prisoner. As a response, the Ottoman forces exiled the Barak Turkmens to the south of Akçakale, around Julab River, with the hopes that rebellious Barak Turkmens and Arab tribes of Tayy and Mawali would eat themselves up. Kadıoğlu Yusuf Pasha offered Barak Turkmens to give a regular tax of one sheep per tent for a pardon from the state. Baraks accepted and gave 84 thousand sheep to Ottoman-sided dedes, and after a long-lasting conflict, they also repelled the Arabs east and south of the area.

Aware of that Ottomans were manipulating them to become guards on the way into Anatolia, Feriz Bey decided to return to the land of Ajam and Turkestan. Every elder supported this idea. Seeing that, Feriz Bey and Ashik Dedemoğlu traveled to Iran to meet with the Shah in order to negotiate a migration. Shah happily accepted this proposal. While Feriz Bey returned, Dedemoğlu and his Abdal followers stayed in Iran. When Feriz Bey returned to Julab, he noticed that tribes were disorganized, and many didn't want to migrate back. Determined, Feriz Bey gathered 40 thousand tents. The ones who wanted to stay in Julab tried to persuade him otherwise; however, he migrated back to Iran, leaving the other half of the tribes (including his children and wife) behind.

Post-Feriz Bey
The Ottomans were afraid that the remaining 40 thousand tents of Baraks were going to pose a problem for them: Baraks were once more in a conflict with Tayy, Mawali, and Milan tribes and again victorious. They were also continuing to rebel: When one of the Turkmen leaders, Bediroğlu, went to Birecik for a certain matter, the mütesellim of Birecik insulted and killed him, which resulted in Baraks storming Birecik and shredding the mütesellim into pieces. Mısırlı Abbas Pasha was then assigned to deal with the Baraks.

Following a meeting between Abbas Pasha and Feriz Bey's son, Mehmed Bey, groups of Baraks were resettled in the vicinity of Urfa and İzmir.

In this period, Baraks also gradually started to settle and farm, although they were unskilled at it and not fully adapted to this lifestyle. Abbas Pasha assigned officials in charge of the harvests.

Migration to the western side of the Euphrates
The Barak Plain at the time was generally occupied by nomadic Kurds of the Reşwan tribe and Bedouins of Mawali tribe. One day, a Barak family who were angry at the rest of the tribe for some reason passed the river. The Reşwan leader welcomed them in his tent. While the Kurds appeared cordial at first, they did not allow the Turkmens to leave. Later, the Kurdish leader raped the Barak wife, and the husband got his mouth and hands wrapped. Eventually, he opened up to his tribe. Furious, Barak Turkmens  took this as an issue of honor. Turkmens were also in a blood feud with the Kurds east of the Euphrates.

Baraks planned another uprising against the state. Burning their crops, they threw 80 Ottoman officials into the fire. At the same time, Baraks passed the river with their camels and herds, starting a bloody battle with the Kurds. Defeated, Kurds fled the region and settled in the Armenian and Chepni-inhabited regions to the north of Nizip. 

Meanwhile, because fertile plateaus that were suitable for grazing were back in the eastern side of the river, the Baraks, who were already partially farmers, quickly adapted to a fully settled life. In 1835, Francis Rawdon Chesney mentioned that the land extending from Sajur River to Birecik was being cultivated by Turkomans of the Barak tribe, which shows that Baraks were either settled or semi-nomadic by early 19th century. In 1855, Carl Ritter mentioned that northwards from Sajur River lived settled Turkomans of the Barak tribe. Still, 70-80 tents of nomad Baraks went further west and spread around Gaziantep, later merging with Yörüks in the region, while staying in touch with the settled Baraks.

Religion
Most Barak Turkmens are Sunni Muslim; however, Baraks used to deviate from the religious practices of many Sunni Turks. In Barak Turkmen villages, mosques used to be uncommon to find, although they held importance for Sunni communities as places of gathering. Many old Barak tribesmen claim that they weren't Sunni but Shiite in the past and became so through close contact with the Sunni Arab tribes. The Barak community used to have spiritually influential members called "dede," who were divided into two types: "Barak Dede" (sometimes called Barak Baba) and "Bozgeyikli Dede." According to traditional narrative, the region that Barak Turkmens inhabited was granted as a reward to Barak Dede, who played an important role in the Baghdad campaign, and his dervishes. The location of these dedes were not known, and they would mysteriously appear in times of the traditional sacrifice. Still, they were accepted as Barak Turkmens. Meanwhile, Bozgeyikli Dedes weren't a part of Barak Turkmens but another Turkmen group and used to stay in a village north of Elbistan. By tradition, every Barak Turkmen household used to regularly donate sheep and goats for Qurban to these two dedes.

Settlements 
The region that Barak Turkmens inhabit is called the Barak Plain, which is also known as Northern Manbij or Tell Basher Plain. The Barak Plain covers three districts of the province of Gaziantep: Karkamış, Nizip, and Oğuzeli. Barak Turkmens populate at least 45 villages in Nizip district, further 18 villages in Oğuzeli district, and all of Karkamış district including the main town. They share some of the villages with other tribes including the Abdal. There are also Barak settlements in İzmir Province, Niğde Province and Nevşehir Province. There are a few Arabic-speaking Baraks near Akçakale.

Culture

Clothes
 
Barak Turkmen women traditionally wear  with a belt. An orange headscarf known as "Ahmediye" worn by women as a part of their traditional folk costume is an iconic piece that has become a symbol of the Baraks. This often features roses and feathers known as "tozak." On some occasions, a fez with coins is worn over Ahmediye. Men wear aba with regional patterns and shalwar with a keffiyeh wrapped around the waist. A white keffiyeh may be worn on the head.

Cuisine
Ezogelin soup is a popular dish from the national cuisine of Turkey that was borrowed from the Barak Turkmens. It is named after the story of Ezo Gelin (also known as Özo or Ezov Gelin), a Barak Turkmen who lived in the early 20th century.

Music
Instruments used in Barak traditional music include saz, zurna, davul, and zambır.

Barak Uzun Hava is the most famous type of music that originates from the Baraks.

Folk dances
Most folk dances of the Baraks involve holding hands and are accompanied by davul, zurna, and zambır. Therefore, they were categorized as "halays," although this name isn't frequently used among this population. Most halays of the Baraks are often slow. Like most halays, there is often a leader (known as "baş çeken" or "baş seken" in the local dialect). It is often claimed that most dances of Baraks include symbols alluding to their forced migration from Central Anatolia. Some halays danced by the Baraks are listed below:
 Hasan Dağı:
Its name refers to a mountain in Central Anatolia.
 Düz-Şirvani or Reşi Düzü:
This dance was borrowed from the Reshwan Kurds living north of Nizip.
 Gaba
 Demircioğlu or Garip Halayı:
This dance involves the poems of Ashiq Qarib.
 Demirci
 Dokuzlu
 Şekeroğlan
 Kuseyri:
Its name means from Kuseyr, the old name of the Altınözü district of Hatay Province.
 Halebi
 Pekmez
 Üç Ayak
 Sinsin

Some dances like Çibikli involve clapping hands.

Baraks also dance their own versions of Karşılama with handkerchiefs in both hands.

Traditions
Barak Turkmens used to practice berdel marriages, and they call it değişik in their local dialect of Turkish.

Sub-tribes
Baraks are made up of many sub-tribes, also composed of constituent tribes. The hierarchy changes from source to source.

Abdurrezaklı: Their settlements are mostly near bodies of water, stretching from the Euphrates coast to Sajur River, and a significant portion of this tribe is in Syria.
 Kasımlı
 Mahmutlu
 Tiryakili
 Çayrazlı
 Ali Dirizli

Kürdülü: This tribe was named after the leader Kürdili Kerim, whose mother was Kurdish and father a Turkmen.
 Boz Muratlı
 Kızılca Şarlı
 Bayındırlı: Named after the leader Bayındır Halid, the half-brother of Kürdili Kerim (from the same father but different mothers).
 Geçili
 Sürkızıllı
 Karabacak
 Mazyalı

Torun:
 İnaluşağı
 Haliduşağı
 Osmanuşağı
 Hacıuşağı
 Muharremli

İsalı (also known as Eseli):
 Karakozak
 Adıklı
 İsalı
 Kıyanlı
 Karamanuşağı

In popular culture
 

Notable people of full or partial Barak origin
 Ali Şahin (born 2 January 1970), Turkish politician, Deputy Minister of European Affairs, Justice and Development Party Member of Parliament for Gaziantep
  (1 January 1936 – 18 November 2006), Turkish politician and lawyer, former Republican People's Party Member of Parliament for Gaziantep
  (1908 – 12 August 1993), Turkish politician, former Democrat Party Member of Parliament for Gaziantep

References

Ethnic groups in Turkey
Turkoman tribes
Turkish people